Nikolaj Haenni (born 2 March 1976) is a Swiss football referee. He refereed his first match in the Swiss Super League on 18 August 2007, when he officiated between F.C. St. Gallen and Neuchâtel Xamax. He has been a FIFA-listed referee since 2011, and is a UEFA category 3 referee.

References

External links
Profile at WorldReferee.com

1976 births
Living people
Swiss football referees